Volcano-sedimentary may refer to:
Volcano-sedimentary rock, a sedimentary rock originating from volcanic material
Volcano-sedimentary sequence, a stratigraphic sequence formed from a combination of volcanic and sedimentary events